The Collingswood Boys are four boys who were starved by their adoptive parents, Raymond and Vanessa Jackson, while living in Collingswood, New Jersey. The Jacksons were arrested in October 2003 and indicted by a grand jury on 8 counts of aggravated assault and 20 counts of endangerment for failing to provide adequate nutrition, medical and dental care, and a clean environment for the four boys, who ranged in age from 10 to 19 as of May 2004.

The case came to public attention after a neighbor found the Jacksons' 19-year-old adoptive son, Bruce, rummaging through their garbage cans for food at three o'clock in the morning on October 10, 2003, and called 911.

The adoptive father, Raymond Jackson, 51, died of complications from a stroke on November 14, 2004, before the case went to trial. In an interview with a New York magazine shortly before his death, Jackson claimed that 45-pound Bruce Jackson had often gorged himself on food and had lied about conditions in the home.

Until the 911 call, no one had reported concerns about the children, although they were often seen in public, including at the Come Alive New Testament Church in Medford, New Jersey, where Raymond and Vanessa Jackson and their adoptive and foster children, including the four boys, always sat in the front row for services. They also attended church picnics and the boys sang gospel on stage. The Jacksons blamed the emaciated conditions of the four boys on medical problems.

The Jacksons had six adopted children: Bruce; Tre'Shawn, 14; Terrell, 10; Michael, 9; Keziah, 12, and Jacee, 5. They also planned to adopt a 10-year-old foster child, Breanna. They received an annual subsidy of approximately $30,000 to care for their foster and adopted children.

Dozens of friends and acquaintances thought that the Jacksons were model parents who adopted troubled children with a host of medical problems – children no one else wanted. They believed that it was their duty and that Jesus would guide them.

Vanessa Jackson, the adoptive mother, eventually pleaded guilty and was sentenced to seven years in prison, but only served one year. Bruce gained  within a year after his removal from the Jacksons' home.

References

Child abuse incidents and cases
Collingswood, New Jersey
Incidents of violence against boys